The minimal group paradigm is a method employed in social psychology. Although it may be used for a variety of purposes, it is best known as a method for investigating the minimal conditions required for discrimination to occur between groups. Experiments using this approach have revealed that even arbitrary distinctions between groups, such as preferences for certain paintings, or the color of their shirts, can trigger a tendency to favor one's own group at the expense of others, even when it means sacrificing in-group gain.

Methodology
Although there are some variations, the traditional minimal group study consists of two phases. In the first phase, participants are randomly and anonymously divided into two groups (e.g., "Group A" and "Group B"), ostensibly on the basis of trivial criteria (e.g., preference for paintings or the toss of a coin). Sometimes, these participants are strangers to one another. In the second phase, participants take part in an ostensibly unrelated resource distribution task. During this task, participants distribute a valuable resource (e.g., money or points) between other participants who are only identified by code number and group membership (e.g., "participant number 34 of Group A"). Participants are told that, after the task is finished, they will receive the total amount of the resource that has been allocated to them by the other participants.

The main purpose of the procedures in the minimal group paradigm is to exclude "objective" influences from the situation. In the context of in-group favoritism, the anonymity of participants' personal identities excludes the influence of interpersonal favoritism. The omission of the self as a recipient in the resource distribution task excludes the influence of direct personal self-interest. The absence of any link between total in-group gain and individual gain excludes the influence of realistic competition. Finally, the absence of intergroup status hierarchies, together with the triviality and minimal social content of the groups, excludes the influence of normative or consensual discrimination.

Minimal group experiments tend to find that, although participants show a significant degree of fairness in their allocations, they also show a significant tendency to allocate more money or points to in-group members than to out-group members. Importantly, this strategy of maximizing relative in-group gain (maximum differentiation) occurs even when it means sacrificing absolute in-group gain ("Vladimir's choice").

Development
Henri Tajfel and colleagues originally developed the minimal group paradigm in the early 1970s as part of their attempt to understand the psychological basis of intergroup discrimination. Tajfel's intention was to create groups with as little meaning as possible and then add meaning to discover at what point discrimination would occur. The surprising finding was that, even in the most minimal group conditions, responses favoring the in-group occurred. Although Tajfel and colleagues originally explained minimal group discrimination in terms of a generic norm for social competition that exists across societies, this explanation was later thought to be "uninteresting" and not offering any real explanatory or predictive power. Tajfel instead developed social identity theory's motivational explanation. In social identity theory, people are thought to award more points to their own group than to the out-group in the minimal group paradigm because, in those circumstances, in-group favoritism is the only way in which to achieve positive distinctiveness.

Further uses
Researchers have recently applied minimal group methodology to investigate prejudice against migrants. The researchers created two hypothetical groups, 'Group A' and 'Group B'. Group assignment was random. The members of the groups were all hypothetical people, and therefore, they had no distinguishable differences. The researchers then chose some members of each group at random to leave their original group and join the opposite group; these members were referred to as migrants. Participants then rated each group member on a seven-point Likert scale for favorability. Migrants were rated as significantly less favorable than non-migrants. This is thought to be in part due to the migrant's exclusion from their original group. Another contributing factor was processing fluency in that migrants were prejudiced against due to the increased cognitive load in categorizing them.
In addition, the minimal group paradigm has been used to investigate the out-group homogeneity effect. In one study, participants were divided into two minimal groups. Each group was given two positive traits and two negative traits. Participants rated their own group as well as estimated ratings for the other group. They also estimated the minimum and maximum ratings for the traits in each group. Participants rated their own group higher on the positive traits and lower on the negative traits. The findings also showed that raters perceived higher variability among their own group's negative traits as well as the out-group's positive traits. The ratings showed that participants viewed their own group more positively as well as more diverse than the out-group.

See also
 Amity-enmity complex
 Discrimination
 Group conflict
 Intergroup relations
 Negative-sum game
 Realistic conflict theory
 The Scorpion and the Frog

References

Group processes